Rosyth railway station serves the town of Rosyth in Fife, Scotland. It was opened in 1917 by the North British Railway (as Rosyth Halt) to serve the nearby naval dockyard.

Services

2011 
In the evenings the service is hourly in each direction and on Sundays two-hourly.

2016
The basic service remains unchanged on weekdays and Saturdays (half-hourly to Edinburgh and Cowdenbeath, with hourly extensions around the full Fife Circle), but there is now an hourly service each way on Sundays.

Upgrade 
In 2013 construction began at Rosyth station to build new disabled access points, so that people with wheelchairs and buggies can make their way onto the platform. There are also plans for a new transport hub to be built at Rosyth, with 500 car park spaces, a bus stance and taxi rank.

References

Railway stations in Fife
Former North British Railway stations
Railway stations in Great Britain opened in 1917
Railway stations served by ScotRail
1917 establishments in Scotland
Rosyth